The COVID-19 pandemic was confirmed to have reached the Luhansk People's Republic (LPR), a disputed Russian republic in eastern Ukraine, in March 2020. For the rest of Ukraine, see COVID-19 pandemic in Ukraine.

Background 
On 12 January 2020, the World Health Organization (WHO) confirmed that a novel coronavirus was the cause of a respiratory illness in a cluster of people in Wuhan City, Hubei Province, China, which was reported to the WHO on 31 December 2019.

The case fatality ratio for COVID-19 has been much lower than SARS of 2003, but the transmission has been significantly greater, with a significant total death toll.

Timeline

April 2020
In April, Ukrainian officials estimated more than 400 cases in the occupied parts of Donetsk and Luhansk, and cast doubt on announcements by the LPR and DPR.

See also
COVID-19 pandemic in the Donetsk People's Republic

Notes

References

Luhansk People's Republic
Luhansk People's Republic
Luhansk People's Republic